"Manboy" is a song performed by Swedish singer Eric Saade. It is the second single from Saade's first album, Masquerade, and was first released on 28 March 2010 in Sweden.

Background
The song was written by Fredrik Kempe and Peter Boström.

Melodifestivalen 2010
In 2010, Saade competed in Melodifestivalen with the song and reached third place.

Other versions
An acoustic version of the song was released on 10 May 2010 in Sweden.
During a pause at Melodifestivalen 2013 the song was performed by Ann-Louise Hanson, Towa Carson and Siw Malmkvist as "Maj-Gull". It was also released on an EP the same year.
In 2017, a cover version was released by Sabina Ddumba as a part of the eighth season of Så mycket bättre.

Awards, nominations and certifications
The song was nominated for two Scandipop Awards 2011 in the categories Best Single from a New Artist and Best Male Single.

Charts

Certifications

Release history

References

External links

Eric Saade Official Website

2010 singles
Melodifestivalen songs of 2010
Eric Saade songs
Number-one singles in Sweden
Songs written by Fredrik Kempe
Songs written by Peter Boström
2010 songs
Roxy Recordings singles
Sabina Ddumba songs
Ann-Louise Hanson songs
Siw Malmkvist songs
Towa Carson songs